72nd NBR Awards
December 6, 2000

Best Film: 
 Quills 
The 72nd National Board of Review Awards, honoring the best in filmmaking in 2000, were announced on 6 December 2000 and given on 16 January 2001.

Top 10 films
Quills
Traffic
Croupier
You Can Count on Me
Billy Elliot
Before Night Falls
Gladiator 
Wonder Boys
Sunshine
Dancer in the Dark

Top Foreign Films
Crouching Tiger, Hidden Dragon
Butterfly
A Time for Drunken Horses
Malèna
Girl on the Bridge

Winners
Best Film: 
Quills
Best Foreign Language Film:
Wo hu cang long (Crouching Tiger, Hidden Dragon), Taiwan/Hong Kong/United States/P.R. China
Best Actor:
Javier Bardem - Before Night Falls
Best Actress:
Julia Roberts - Erin Brockovich
Best Supporting Actor:
Joaquin Phoenix - Gladiator
Best Supporting Actress:
Lupe Ontiveros - Chuck & Buck
Breakthrough Performance - Male:
Jamie Bell - Billy Elliot
Breakthrough Performance - Female:
Michelle Rodríguez - Girlfight
Best Acting by and Ensemble:
State and Main
Best Director:
Steven Soderbergh - Erin Brockovich and Traffic
Best Screenplay:
All the Pretty Horses - Ted Tally
Best Documentary Feature:
The Life and Times of Hank Greenberg
Best Animated Feature:
Chicken Run
Career Achievement Award:
Ellen Burstyn
Special Filmmaking Achievement:
Kenneth Lonergan - You Can Count on Me
Outstanding Production Design:
Arthur Max - Gladiator
Career Achievement - Music Composition:
Ennio Morricone
William K. Everson Award for Film History:
Roger Gottlieb and Robert Kimball, Reading Lyrics
Special Citations:
Björk - Outstanding Dramatic Music Performance, Dancer in the Dark
Dekalog, Outstanding Cinematic Series
Freedom of Expression:
A Time for Drunken Horses
Bamboozled
Before Night Falls
The Circle
Kadosh
Quills
Sound and Fury
The Visit
Special Recognition for Excellence in Filmmaking:
American Psycho
Best in Show
Chuck & Buck
Girlfight
Hamlet
Nurse Betty
Requiem for a Dream
Shower 
Snatch
Two Family House

External links
National Board of Review of Motion Pictures :: Awards for 2000

2000
2000 film awards
2000 in American cinema